Northwestern Polytechnic University (NPU), now known as San Francisco Bay University, is a private, non profit university in Fremont, California. Founded in 1984, the university awards bachelor's and master's degrees in computer science, engineering, technology and management programs.

NPU was founded by Dr. Ramsey Carter and Dr. Barbara Brown in 1984. Dr. George Hsieh served as the University’s president from 1991 to 2015. As of 2022, the school was renamed as San Francisco Bay University.

History
Northwestern Polytechnic University (NPU) was founded by Dr. Ramsey Carter and Dr. Barbara Brown on January 2, 1984 and incorporated as a California nonprofit, public-benefit institution. The School of Engineering began granting Bachelor of Science degrees in electrical engineering in November 1984, followed by the Master of Science in electrical engineering in 1985.

In 1987, NPU opened the Computer Systems Engineering programs at both the bachelor's and master's levels.  Two years later, on February 23, 1989 the university attained full institutional approval from the California Department of Education.

In 1995, NPU established its School of Business.

In 1991, Dr. George Hsieh began serving as NPU's president.

In 2015, Dr. Hsieh retired.

In 2016, a BuzzFeed news article questioned the operations of NPU during the period in its history of its high (more than 6,000 in 2015) proportion of international students from India.

In 2018, the institution's accreditation was renewed.

In 2019, a San Jose Mercury News article was published outlining that NPU had continued to meet its job placement compliance requirements and the warning was removed by the Accrediting Council for Independent Colleges and Schools.

In 2021, the NPU changed its name to San Francisco Bay University.

Academics 
San Francisco Bay University offers the following degrees: Master of Business Administration, Master of Science, and Bachelor of Science

NPU/San Francisco Bay University has been accredited continuously since 1998, presently by the WASC Senior College and University Commission (WSCUC/WASC). The Commission on English Language Program Accreditation accredits San Francisco Bay University's Intensive English Program.

References

External links
Official website

1984 establishments in California
Education in Fremont, California
Educational institutions established in 1984
Private universities and colleges in California
Universities and colleges in Alameda County, California
Technological universities in the United States
Schools accredited by the Western Association of Schools and Colleges